Sepak takraw was contested at the 1990 Asian Games in Beijing, China by men, with all games taking place at Fengtai Sports Center.

Malaysia won both gold medals and finished first in the medal table.

Medalists

Medal table

Participating nations

References

External links
 Olympic Council of Asia

 
1990 Asian Games events
1990